Justice Land may refer to:

Alfred D. Land (1842–1917), associate justice of the Louisiana Supreme Court
John R. Land (1862–1941), associate justice of the Louisiana Supreme Court
Thomas Thompson Land (1815–1893), associate justice of the Louisiana Supreme Court